James Dawos Mamit (4 November 1948 – 9 July 2019) was a Malaysian politician. He was the Member of Parliament of Malaysia for the Mambong constituency in Sarawak, representing the United Traditional Bumiputera Party (PBB). He was also the former Deputy Minister of Energy, Green Technology and Water in the Barisan Nasional coalition government.

Dawos was appointed as Deputy Minister of Tourism on 14 December 2009, replacing Sulaiman Abdul Rahman Taib. As a backbencher, he had promoted the preservation of Bidayuh language and culture.

On 16 May 2013, after his victory in the 13th General Election, he was appointed as Deputy Minister of Natural Resources and Environment.

Election results

Honours
  :
  Commander of the Order of the Star of Sarawak (PSBS) - Dato (2006)
  :
  Grand Knight of the Order of Sultan Ahmad Shah of Pahang (SSAP) - Dato' Sri (2012)

References

1948 births
2019 deaths
Members of the Dewan Rakyat
Parti Pesaka Bumiputera Bersatu politicians
Bidayuh people
Malaysian Christians
21st-century Malaysian politicians
People from Sarawak